A Strange Manuscript Found in a Copper Cylinder is the most popular book by James De Mille. It was serialized posthumously and anonymously in Harper's Weekly,
and published in book form by Harper and Brothers of New York City during 1888. It was serialized subsequently in the United Kingdom and Australia, and published in book form in the United Kingdom and Canada. Later editions were published from the plates of the Harper and Brothers first edition, during the late 19th and early 20th centuries.

The satiric and fantastic romance is set in an imaginary semi-tropical land in Antarctica inhabited by prehistoric monsters and a cult of death-worshipers called the Kosekin. Written many years before it was published, it is reminiscent of Edgar Allan Poe's The Narrative of Arthur Gordon Pym of Nantucket and anticipates the exotic locale and fantasy-adventure elements of works of the "Lost World genre" such as Arthur Conan Doyle's The Lost World and Edgar Rice Burroughs' The Land That Time Forgot, as well as innumerable prehistoric world movies based loosely on these and other works. The title and locale were inspired by Edgar Allan Poe's Ms. Found in a Bottle.

It was unfortunate for De Mille's reputation as a writer that this work was published after She and King Solomon's Mines. Although H. Rider Haggard's works were well known by then, the actual composition of De Mille's romance pre-dated the publication of the popular romances and his ideas were not in the least derivative from Haggard's better known works.

Plot summary
The main story of the novel is the narrative of the adventures of Adam More, a British sailor shipwrecked on a homeward voyage from Tasmania. After passing through a tunnel of volcanic origin, he finds himself in a "lost world" of prehistoric animals, plants and people sustained by volcanic heat despite the long Antarctic night.

A secondary plot of four yachtsmen who find the manuscript written by Adam More and sealed in a copper cylinder forms a frame for the central narrative. They comment on More's report, and one identifies the Kosekin language as a Semitic language, possibly derived from Hebrew.

In his strange volcanic world, More also finds a well-developed human society which in the tradition of topsy-turvy worlds of folklore and satire (compare Sir Thomas More's Utopia, Erewhon by Samuel Butler, or Charlotte Perkins Gilman's Herland) has reversed the values of 19th century Western society: wealth is scorned and poverty is revered, death and darkness are preferred to life and light. Rather than accumulating wealth, the natives seek to divest themselves of it as quickly as possible.

Critical reception

Contemporary reviews of the novel, unaware that it was written earlier,  were coloured by the prior release of She and King Solomon's Mines by H. Rider Haggard.  A review in The New York Times, 21 May 1888, notes that "if the author of 'A Strange Manuscript' were living he would find it a quite hopeless task to persuade people that he had not read and imitated She and King Solomon's Mines"
while a review in the Brooklyn Daily Eagle, 3 June 1888, called the book a "somewhat belated story".  Both reviews, along with a July 1888 review in The Week, a Toronto newspaper, commented positively on the illustrations by Gilbert Gaul.

See also 
Lost World (genre)

References

A scholarly edition of the work was published by the Centre for Editing Early Canadian Texts (CEECT) (see below). This edition is the source of the information provided by this article.

Bibliography
A Strange Manuscript Found in a Copper Cylinder was first published in nineteen installments in Harper's Weekly, Vol. 32, from January 7, 1888 (No. 1620) to May 12, 1888 (No. 1638). Each installment was accompanied by an illustration by Gilbert Gaul.
De Mille, James. A Strange Manuscript Found in a Copper Cylinder. First American Edition. Harper and Brothers, New York, 1888.
De Mille, James. A Strange Manuscript Found in a Copper Cylinder. First British Edition. Chatto and Windus, London, 1888.
De Mille, James. A Strange Manuscript Found in a Copper Cylinder. First Canadian Edition. Robinson, Montreal, 1888.
De Mille, James. A Strange Manuscript Found in a Copper Cylinder. New Canadian Library Edition. McClelland and Stewart, Toronto, 1969.
De Mille, James. A Strange Manuscript Found in a Copper Cylinder. Edited by Malcolm Parks. Carleton University Press, Ottawa, 1986.  (hardcover),  (paperback)
De Mille, James. A Strange Manuscript Found in a Copper Cylinder. Edited by Daniel Burgoyne. Broadview Press, Peterborough, 2011. .

External links 
 
 
 The book as serialized in Harper's Weekly in 1888

1888 science fiction novels
19th-century Canadian novels
Canadian fantasy novels
New Canadian Library
Novels set in Antarctica
Hollow Earth in fiction
Lost world novels
Novels first published in serial form
Works published anonymously
Works originally published in Harper's Weekly
Novels published posthumously
Harper & Brothers books
Dystopian novels